The 2000 Porsche Tennis Grand Prix was a women's tennis tournament played on indoor hard courts at the Filderstadt Tennis Club in Filderstadt, Germany that was part of Tier II of the 2000 WTA Tour. It was the 23rd edition of the tournament and was held from 2 October until 8 October 2000. First-seeded Martina Hingis won the singles title and earned $87,000 first-prize money.

Finals

Singles

 Martina Hingis defeated  Kim Clijsters 6–0, 6–3
 It was Hingis' 6th singles title of the year and the 32nd of her career.

Doubles

 Martina Hingis /  Anna Kournikova defeated  Arantxa Sánchez Vicario /  Barbara Schett 6–4, 6–2

Prize money

References

External links
 ITF tournament edition details
 Tournament draws

Porsche Tennis Grand Prix
Porsche Tennis Grand Prix
2000 in German tennis
2000s in Baden-Württemberg
Porsch